Wallace Joe "Chief" Newman (c. 1901 – November 6, 1985) was an American football and baseball player and coach. He served as the head football coach at Whittier College in Whittier, California from 1929 to 1950, compiling a record of 102–66–14. Newman also coached basketball and baseball at Whittier and was the school's athletic director.

Newman played football and baseball at the University of Southern California (USC). He played the 1923 Rose Bowl, the first bowl game appearance for the USC Trojans. Newman coached at Covina High School in Covina, California for four years before he was hired at Whittier. Newman was Native American and an enrolled member of the La Jolla Band of Luiseno Indians and the Mission Creek Band of Mission Indians which he led as President from 1957 until shortly before termination. In the early 1930s, he coached Richard Nixon, who was a reserve player for Whittier and went on to become President of the United States.

Newman died on November 6, 1985, at the age of 84.

Head coaching record

College football

References

External links
 

Year of birth missing
1900s births
1985 deaths
American football guards
USC Trojans baseball players
USC Trojans football players
Whittier Poets athletic directors
Whittier Poets baseball coaches
Whittier Poets football coaches
Whittier Poets men's basketball coaches
High school football coaches in California